The 1988–89 Football League Cup (known as the Littlewoods Challenge Cup for sponsorship reasons) was the 29th season of the Football League Cup, a knockout competition for England's top 92 football clubs. The competition started on 29 August 1988 and ended with the final on 9 April 1989.

The final was contested by First Division teams Nottingham Forest and holders Luton Town at Wembley Stadium in London.

First round

First Leg

Second Leg

Second round

First Leg

Second Leg

Third round

Ties

Replays

2nd Replay

Fourth round

Ties

Replays

Fifth Round

Ties

Replay

Semi-finals
Nottingham Forest, flying high in the First Division, had a narrow victory over Third Division underdogs Bristol City in the semi-finals, while holders Luton Town enjoyed a comfortable triumph over West Ham United in both legs.

First Leg

Second Leg

Final

References

General

Specific

EFL Cup seasons
1988–89 domestic association football cups
Lea
Cup